The Czech Republic competed at the 2014 Summer Youth Olympics, in Nanjing, China, from 16 August to 28 August 2014.

Medalists
Medals awarded to participants of mixed-NOC (Combined) teams are represented in italics. These medals are not counted towards the individual NOC medal tally.

Athletics

Czech Republic qualified six athletes.

Qualification Legend: Q=Final A (medal); qB=Final B (non-medal); qC=Final C (non-medal); qD=Final D (non-medal); qE=Final E (non-medal)

Girls
Track & road events

Field events

Basketball

Czech Republic qualified a girls' team based on the 1 June 2014 FIBA 3x3 National Federation Rankings.

Skills Competition

Girls' Tournament

Roster
 Gabriela Andelova
 Sarah Berankova
 Tereza Kracikova
 Aneta Zuzakova

Group Stage

Knockout Stage

Beach Volleyball

Czech Republic qualified a girls' team from their performance at the 2014 CEV Youth Continental Cup Final.

Canoeing

Czech Republic qualified four boats based on its performance at the 2013 World Junior Canoe Sprint and Slalom Championships.

Boys

Girls

Cycling

Czech Republic qualified a boys' and girls' team based on its ranking issued by the UCI.

Team

Mixed Relay

Gymnastics

Artistic Gymnastics

Czech Republic qualified one athlete based on its performance at the 2014 European WAG Championships.

Girls

Judo

Czech Republic qualified one athlete based on its performance at the 2013 Cadet World Judo Championships.

Individual

Team

Modern Pentathlon

Czech Republic qualified two athletes based on its performance at the 2014 Youth A World Championships.

Rowing

Czech Republic qualified one boat based on its performance at the 2013 World Rowing Junior Championships. Later Czech Republic was given a reallocation quota.

Qualification Legend: FA=Final A (medal); FB=Final B (non-medal); FC=Final C (non-medal); FD=Final D (non-medal); SA/B=Semifinals A/B; SC/D=Semifinals C/D; R=Repechage

Shooting

Czech Republic qualified one shooter based on its performance at the 2014 European Shooting Championships.

Individual

Team

Swimming

Czech Republic qualified four swimmers.

Boys

Girls

Mixed

Table Tennis

Czech Republic qualified one athlete based on its performance at the 2014 World Qualification Event. Later another athlete qualified from reallocation of quotas.

Singles

Team

Qualification Legend: Q=Main Bracket (medal); qB=Consolation Bracket (non-medal)

Taekwondo

Czech Republic qualified one athlete based on its performance at the Taekwondo Qualification Tournament.

Girls

Tennis

Czech Republic qualified two athletes based on the 9 June 2014 ITF World Junior Rankings.

Singles

Doubles

External links
 iaaf.org

References

2014 in the Czech Republic
Nations at the 2014 Summer Youth Olympics
Czech Republic at the Youth Olympics